Jennifer Lyn Roizen is an American chemist who is a professor at Duke University. Roizen studies C-H functionalization, antibiotics and selective ion channel inhibitors. She joined the International Advisory Board of Angewandte Chemie in 2021.

Early life and education 
Roizen was an undergraduate student at Williams College, where she was first introduced to asymmetric synthesis. She was awarded the James F. Skinner Prize for scholarship. She moved to the California Institute of Technology for graduate studies, where she worked under the supervision of Brian Stoltz. Her research considered enantioselective synthesis of ineleganolide. Her work led to the development of asymmetric ketone alkylation to form C(α)-tetrasubstituted carbonyl compounds.

Research and career 
Roizen remained on the West Coast for postdoctoral research, where she joined the laboratories of Justin Du Bois. Her research considered the intermolecular amination of tertiary C–H bonds.

Roizen was appointed to the faculty at Duke University in 2013. Her research considers free radical reactions. In 2017, she was awarded the Thieme Chemistry Journal's Award and was named one of ChemComm's Emerging Investigators. She was awarded the 2020 Duke University Dean's Award.

Selected publications

References 

Living people
Duke University faculty
Williams College alumni
California Institute of Technology alumni
21st-century American chemists
Year of birth missing (living people)